Ukrainian Automobile Manufacturers, or UkrAutoProm, is a Ukrainian automobile and motor vehicle association. The Association “Ukrautoprom” was organized in 1998 on the initiative of the leading enterprises and organizations of the motor-car industry in Ukraine, supported by the Ministry of industrial policy with the aim of representing their interests in defining the strategy of the development of the automobile-building, creating the legal basis for the state support and stimulation of this major economical field. UkrAutoProm is headquartered in 15/2 Zaplavna, Kyiv, Ukraine.

Association "Ukrautoprom" is a member of International Organization of Motor Vehicle Manufacturers (OICA). Association "Ukrautoprom" is also the organizer of Kyiv International motor show SIA.

Members
Etalon-Auto Corporation
Chernihiv Bus Factory
Boryspil Bus Factory
Eurocar
UkrAuto Corporation
ZAZ
Bogdan Corporation
AutoKrAZ
PozhSpetsMash Factory
Premier Expo
DerzhAvtoTrans

See also
Automotive industry in Ukraine
Economy of Ukraine
Korea Automobile Manufacturers Association
Japan Automobile Manufacturers Association

References

External links
Ukrainian Automobile Manufacturers Association Homepage

Motor vehicle manufacturers of Ukraine
Organizations established in 1998
Motor trade associations
Ukrainian companies established in 1998